Baron Shaughnessy, of the City of Montreal in the Dominion of Canada and of Ashford in the County of Limerick, is a title in the Peerage of the United Kingdom. It was created in 1916 for the Milwaukee born businessman Thomas Shaughnessy, president of the Canadian Pacific Railway Company. He was succeeded by his eldest son, the second Baron, a Director of the CPR and of the Canadian Bank of Commerce. His son, the third Baron, was a businessman and was also active in the House of Lords. However, he lost his hereditary seat in parliament after the House of Lords Act 1999.

The line of the eldest son of the first Baron failed on the death of the third Baron's son, the fourth Baron, in 2007. The late Baron was succeeded by his second cousin, the fifth Baron and present Lord Shaughnessy, who is better known as the actor Charles Shaughnessy, star of the American TV comedy The Nanny and the soap opera Days of Our Lives. The fifth Baron's late father was Alfred Shaughnessy, a scriptwriter and producer,  and son of the Hon. Alfred Shaughnessy, younger son of the first Baron. The heir presumptive to the title is David Shaughnessy, younger brother of the fifth Baron, an actor and producer. No other heir exists, unless the fifth Baron or his younger brother fathers a son.

Barons Shaughnessy (1916)
Thomas George Shaughnessy, 1st Baron Shaughnessy (1853–1923)
William James Shaughnessy, 2nd Baron Shaughnessy (1883–1938)
William Graham Shaughnessy, 3rd Baron Shaughnessy (1922–2003)
Michael James Shaughnessy, 4th Baron Shaughnessy (1946–2007)
Charles George Patrick Shaughnessy, 5th Baron Shaughnessy (b. 1955)

The heir presumptive is the present holder's younger brother David James Bradford Shaughnessy (b. 1957).

There are no further heirs.

Line of Succession

  Thomas George Shaughnessy, 1st Baron Shaughnessy (1853–1923) 
  William James Shaughnessy, 2nd Baron Shaughnessy (1883–1938)
  William Graham Shaughnessy, 3rd Baron Shaughnessy (1922–2003)
  Michael James Shaughnessy, 4th Baron Shaughnessy (1946–2007)
 Hon. Alfred Thomas Shaughnessy (1887–1916)
 Alfred James Shaughnessy (1916–2005)
  Charles George Patrick Shaughnessy, 5th Baron Shaughnessy (born 1955)
 (1) David James Bradford Shaughnessy (b. 1957)

See also
 Canadian Hereditary Peers
 O'Shaughnessy
 Uí Fiachrach Aidhne
 Cenél Áeda na hEchtge
List of Bishop's College School alumni

Notes

References

Kidd, Charles, Williamson, David (editors). Debrett's Peerage and Baronetage (1990 edition). New York: St Martin's Press, 1990, 

(2nd & 3rd)

Baronies in the Peerage of the United Kingdom
Noble titles created in 1916
Bishop's College School alumni